Geng Lijuan (born January 15, 1963) is a Chinese-Canadian table tennis player. She is a four-time World Champion, former World #1 and member of the Chinese National Team.

Geng retired from the Chinese national team before the 1988 Seoul Olympics, and married her mixed doubles partner in the world championships, a Romanian table tennis player who had emigrated to Canada. She moved to Canada in 1989, then played professionally in a German club for four years.

She returned to Ottawa in 1994, bought a pizza shop with her husband, and expanded it to three shops. She plays table tennis in her spare time and represented Canada internationally in the 1996 and 2000 Olympic Games. Her career includes winning numerous international Open tournaments such as the French Open, US Open, Italian Open, and German Open. She was a multi-gold medallist at the Pan American Games and many times Canadian and North American Champion.

After she stopped competing, she established the Geng Table Tennis Academy. Jimmy Pintea, Sonia Qin, Andrea Liu, Ly Quan Li, and Shannon Zheng have worked with Geng at the academy. In 2010 Lijuan was the coach of the National Team players at the National Training Center in Ottawa.

References

External links
 
 
 
 
 Geng Lijuan Website gengtabletennis.com

1963 births
Living people
Canadian female table tennis players
Chinese female table tennis players
Olympic table tennis players of Canada
Table tennis players at the 1996 Summer Olympics
Table tennis players at the 2000 Summer Olympics
Asian Games medalists in table tennis
Asian Games gold medalists for China
Asian Games silver medalists for China
Table tennis players at the 1986 Asian Games
Medalists at the 1986 Asian Games
Commonwealth Games medallists in table tennis
Commonwealth Games bronze medallists for Canada
Pan American Games medalists in table tennis
Pan American Games gold medalists for Canada
Pan American Games silver medalists for Canada
Table tennis players from Hebei
Chinese emigrants to Canada
People from Lulong County
Naturalised table tennis players
Table tennis players at the 1995 Pan American Games
Table tennis players at the 1999 Pan American Games
Table tennis players at the 2002 Commonwealth Games
Medalists at the 1995 Pan American Games
Medalists at the 1999 Pan American Games
Medallists at the 2002 Commonwealth Games